Riccardo Francolini is a Panamanian banker. Francolini has been accused of corruption and found innocent.

See also
Crime in Panama
Economy of Panama

References

Living people
Panamanian bankers
Year of birth missing (living people)
Place of birth missing (living people)
People named in the Panama Papers